The 1984 Canadian Grand Prix was a Formula One motor race held at Circuit Gilles Villeneuve, Montreal on 17 June 1984. It was the seventh race of the 1984 Formula One World Championship.

The 70-lap race was won by Brazilian Nelson Piquet, driving a Brabham-BMW. Piquet took pole position, led all 70 laps and set the fastest race lap, finishing 2.6 seconds ahead of Austrian Niki Lauda in the McLaren-TAG. Lauda's French teammate, Alain Prost, finished third.

The top six was completed by Elio de Angelis in the Lotus-Renault, René Arnoux in the Ferrari, and Nigel Mansell in the other Lotus-Renault.

After the race, Piquet climbed out of his car and collapsed on the ground, due to a badly burned right foot caused by the extreme heat from his Brabham's new nose-mounted oil cooler which had actually burned a hole in his driving boot. In the next race at Detroit, he had a special tray of ice for easing the blisters on his foot.

Classification

Qualifying

Race

Championship standings after the race 

Drivers' Championship standings

Constructors' Championship standings

References

Canadian Grand Prix
Grand Prix
Canadian Grand Prix
Grand Prix